The German Society for Celtic Studies was a German institute founded in December 1936 for the research of Celtic studies.

History 
The DGKS belonged to the Indo-European Seminar of the University of Berlin. It was set up from the beginning as a contact point between the German Celtologists and the Schutzstaffel. Immediately after its founding, SS-Obergruppenführer Werner Best and Ahnenerbe became cooperative members. Best was at this time de facto Interior Minister of France and German national propaganda. In addition, the work of the Institute has been dressed up ideologically: It was said in reports from the Reich, "to supplement the old, merely linguistically oriented research with racial and folkloric research".

Important founding members were Helmut Bauersfeld, Hans Otto Wagner, Adolf Mahr, and Helmut Clissmann. After the start of World War II some members of the DGKS were assigned special tasks in the Abwehr and the Foreign Office, particularly in the Benelux countries, and in northern France. In the course of its existence, the cooperation between the DGKS and Ahnenerbe became ever closer. Mühlhausen from the beginning of 1940 also worked with Leo Weisgerber for foreign broadcasting propaganda. At a Celtic congress in Wernigerode at the beginning of September 1941, Mühlhausen spoke in favor of the continuation and "use of humanities in war". In June 1942, Mühlhausen was leader of an "education and research center for Celtic people research" newly established in the Ahnenerbe.

While working in collaboration with the SS-Ahnenerbe the DGKS was involved in espionage, as well as sabotage and encouraging Celtic ethnic minorities towards insurrection in Brittany and the British Isles, like Ireland and the Isle of Man.

See also 
 
 Olier Mordrel
 François Debeauvais
 Frank-Rutger Hausmann

References

External links 
 Reiner Luyken: "Keltologie: Über die Verquickung von Wissenschaft und Nationalsozialismus“ in: Die Zeit vom 19. Juli 1996

1936 establishments in Germany
Organizations established in 1936
Learned societies of Germany
Celtic studies
Ethnic studies